Acleris klotsi is a species of moth of the family Tortricidae. It is found in North America, where it has been recorded from Arizona.

The length of the forewings is 7–8 mm. The forewings are whitish ochreous with three parallel oblique ochreous bands. The hindwings are white. Adults have been recorded on wing in July.

References

Moths described in 1963
klotsi
Moths of North America